Littman is a surname. Notable people with the name include:

 David Littman (disambiguation), multiple people, including:
 David Littman (activist) (1933–2012), British human rights activist
 David Littman (ice hockey) (born 1967), American ice hockey goaltender
 Frederic Littman (1907–1979), Hungarian-American sculptor
 Lisa Littman, medical researcher at the center of the rapid onset gender dysphoria controversy
 Lynne Littman (born 1941), American film and television director and producer
 Marguerite Littman (1930-2020), American-British socialite and HIV/AIDS activist
 Michael L. Littman (born 1966), American computer scientist

See also 
 Littmann
 Litman